Earth Omen is the third album by American rock band Frijid Pink, released in 1972.

The band, recently abandoned by their original singer and guitarist, shed their blues-based rock sound and picked up a more progressive rock sound (reminiscent of Uriah Heep), with added psychedelia. This was largely thanks to the addition of singer Jon Wearing, guitarist Craig Webb, and keyboardist Larry Zelanka (Zelanka was only considered a guest on the previous two albums).

The German CD release (Repertoire Records) features two bonus tracks.

Track listing
"Miss Evil" - 6:24
"Sailor" - 4:21
"Earth Omen" - 3:32
"Lazy Day" - 4:38
"Train Woman" - 3:59
"Eternal Dream" - 4:18
"New Horizon" - 4:20
"Rainbow Rider" - 2:57
"Mr. Blood" - 4:39

Bonus tracks

"Lazy Day" (Single Edit) - 3:07
"Go Now" (Non-Album Single) - 2:57

Personnel 

Jon Wearing - lead vocals
Richard Stevers - drums
Tom Harris - bass
Craig Webb - guitars

Additional:
Larry Zelanka - keyboards

References

External links
Earth Omen on Discogs

1972 albums
Frijid Pink albums